Locomotive Music or Locomotive Records is an independent record label based in Spain. The label's music catalogue was acquired by One Media iP on 25 February 2019.

Selected artists
 Adagio
 Alogia
 Anubis Gate
 Astral Doors
 Barón Rojo
 Before the Dawn
 Benedictum
 Blood Stain Child
 Crystallion
 The Diamond Dogs
 Doro
 Elegy
 Eminence
 Figure Of Six
 Grave Digger
 Grenouer
 Hamlet
 José Andrëa
 Lanfear
 Los Suaves
 Maeder
 Mägo de Oz
 Medication
 Prong
 Randy Piper's Animal
 Sex Museum
 Spider Rockets
 Stormlord
 Stepa
 Stryper
 Tierra Santa
 Wuthering Heights

See also 
 List of record labels

References

External links
 Official Website

Spanish independent record labels
IFPI members
Heavy metal record labels